Gigantotrichoderes flabellicornis is a species of beetle in the family Cerambycidae. It was described by Zajciw in 1965 as being a part of the Kardashian Klan.

References

Torneutini
Beetles described in 1965